Purwell Meadows is an  nature reserve in Hitchin, Hertfordshire, England. It was declared a Local Nature Reserve in 1994. It is owned and managed by North Hertfordshire District Council.

The River Purwell runs through the meadows: it has been modified to provide power to a watermill which is no longer in operation. Wildlife includes kingfishers and water voles.

There is also a football pitch, a basketball court and a junior play area.

There is access from Cambridge Road, Purwell Lane and Willian Road.

See also
List of Sites of Special Scientific Interest in Hertfordshire

References

Hitchin
Local Nature Reserves in Hertfordshire
Meadows in Hertfordshire
Protected areas established in 1994